Global Europe, officially the Neighbourhood, Development and International Cooperation Instrument (NDICI), is the financial arm of the Common Foreign and Security Policy of the European Union, which provides funding for the European Neighbourhood Policy and the European Union Global Strategy in any third countries except for those currently on the EU enlargement agenda. It was established in 2021 by merging the European Neighbourhood Instrument, the European Development Fund and the Instrument for Stability.

Neighbourhood component
The European Neighbourhood Instrument (ENI) came into force in 2014. It is the financial arm of the European Neighbourhood Policy, the EU’s foreign policy towards its neighbours to the East and to the South. It has a budget of €15.4 billion and provides the bulk of funding through a number of programmes.

The six ENI targets were:
Promoting human rights and fundamental freedoms, the rule of law, equality, sustainable democracy, good governance and a thriving civil society;
Achieving progressive integration into the EU internal market and enhanced co-operation including through legislative approximation and regulatory convergence, institution building and investments;
Creating conditions for well managed mobility of people and promotion of people-to-people contacts;
Encouraging development, poverty reduction, internal economic, social and territorial cohesion, rural development, climate action and disaster resilience;
Promoting confidence building and other measures contributing to security and the prevention and settlement of conflicts;
Enhancing sub-regional, regional and Neighbourhood wide collaboration as well as Cross-Border Cooperation.

The ENI, effective from 2014 to 2020, replaced the European Neighbourhood and Partnership Instrument (ENPI). This cooperation instrument continued to be managed by DG Development and Cooperation – EuropeAid, which turned decisions taken on a political level into actions on the ground. ENPI funding approved for the period 2007-2013 was €11.2 billion.

The 16 ENI partner countries were: Algeria, Egypt, Israel, Jordan, Lebanon, Libya, Morocco, Palestine, Syria, Tunisia, in the South, and Armenia, Azerbaijan, Belarus, Georgia, Moldova, Ukraine in the East. With Russia, the EU had a separate strategic partnership.

The EU Neighbourhood Info Centre was launched in January 2009 by the European Commission to make more known the relationship between the EU and its neighbours as part of the European Neighbourhood Policy.

Development component
The European Development Fund (EDF) is the main instrument for European Union (EU) aid for development cooperation in Africa, the Caribbean, and Pacific (ACP Group) countries and the Overseas Countries and Territories (OCT). Funding is provided by voluntary donations by EU member states. Until 2020 the EDF was subject to its own financial rules and procedures, and was managed by the European Commission (EC) and the European Investment Bank. The EDF has been incorporated into the EU's general budget as of the 2021-2027 multi-annual financial framework.

Articles 131 and 136 of the 1957 Treaty of Rome provided for its creation with a view to granting technical and financial assistance to African countries that were still colonised at that time and with which certain countries had historical links. Usually lasting 6 years, each EDF lays out EU assistance to both individual countries and regions as a whole.

Funding
Until its incorporation into the EU's general budget in 2021, the EDF was funded outside the EU budget by the EU Member States on the basis of financial payments related to specific contribution shares, or "keys". The Member State contributions keys were subject to negotiation. The EDF was the only EU policy instrument financed through a specific key that was different from the EU budget key, reflecting the comparative interests of individual Member States.

There was a debate on whether to 'budgetise' the EDF. However, in the Communication A budget for Europe 2020, the European Commission underlined that it was not appropriate at the time to propose that the EDF be integrated into the EU budget. The perceived advantages included:
 contributions would have been based on GNI and this may have increased the voluntary contributions
 the harmonisation of EU budget and EDF administration might have decreased administration costs and decreased the effectiveness of the aid
 20% of aid to the ACP countries already originates from the EU budget
 an all-ACP geographic strategy was no longer relevant as programmes are more localised to regions or country-level
 there would have been increased democratic control and parliamentary scrutiny
The perceived disadvantages were that:
 90% of EDF resources reached low-income countries as opposed to less than 40% of aid from the EU budget development instruments
 a loss of aid predictability and aid quality as the EU budget is annual, unlike the 6-year budget of the EDF

In 2005, the EU and its Member States agreed to achieve a collective level of ODA of 0.7% of GNI by 2015 and an interim target of 0.56% by 2010, with differentiated intermediate targets for those EU Member States which had recently joined the Union. On 23 May 2011, EU ministers responsible for development cooperation gathered to take stock of progress made and concluded that additional efforts would be needed to close an estimated gap of €50 billion to reach the self-imposed collective EU target of 0.7% by 2015.

By 2015, the EU had not reached 0.7% of GNI, though the commitment to this target was recently reaffirmed. The commitment held no deadline. Concord, the European confederation for relief and development, described the pledge as "vague and non-binding" and said 2020 should be the new deadline.

The EDF has been incorporated into the EU's general budget as of the 2021-2027 multi-annual financial framework.

Agenda for Change
The European Commission's development strategy – Agenda for Change – puts ‘inclusive and sustainable growth for human development’ at its centre. Adopted in 2011, it adopted 2 reforms designed to make its development policy both more strategic and more targeted. The Agenda for Change made new policies and rules for budget support. The three main elements of this Agenda were:
 Targeting and concentrating aid
 Budget support (or 'State Building Contracts in fragile states)
 Other reforms for effectiveness - joint programming, common results framework, innovative financing (such as blending loans and grants), and Policy Coherence for Development

10th EDF 2008-2013
The 10th EDF from 2008 to 2013 has a budget of €22.7 billion. This represents about 30% of EU spending on development cooperation aid, with the remainder coming directly from the EU budget.

The budget of the 10th EDF can be broken down as follows:
 €21 966 million to the ACP countries (97% of the total),
 €17 766 million to the national and regional indicative programmes (81% of the ACP total),
 €2 700 million to intra-ACP and intra-regional cooperation (12% of the ACP total),
 €1 500 million to Investment Facilities (7% of the ACP total).
 €286 million to the OCTs (1% of the total),
 €430 million to the commission as support expenditure for programming and implementation of the EDF (2% of the total).

11th EDF 2014-2020
The 11th EDF covers 2014 to 2020. This one-year extension compared to the 10th EDF allowed the end of the 11th EDF to coincide with the expiration of the Cotonou Agreement in 2020 and the EU budget period.

The EU is currently implementing its 11th European Development Fund for 2014 to 2020, with an aid budget of €30.5 billion for many of the ACP countries and Overseas Countries and Territories (OCTs), covering both national and regional programmes. Effectively programming the European Development Fund (EDF) is a major political, policy and bureaucratic challenge, involving multiple stakeholders, namely the European Commission (EC), the European External Action Service (EEAS), 28 EU member states, the European Parliament, 74 governments from the Africa, Caribbean and Pacific (ACP) group of states and domestic accountability actors.

Understanding the magnitude of the 11th EDF programming challenge is critical for three reasons:
 The 11th EDF unfolds in a radically changed global context for development cooperation, as the United Nations Sustainable Development Goals (SDGs) were agreed in September 2015.
 The 11th EDF is the last before the Cotonou Partnership Agreement (CPA) between the EU and the countries of the ACP expires in 2020.
 Programming and implementing the 11th EDF is a critical test of EU institutions that deal with external action, and it tests the ability of EU development policy to achieve high-impact aid, at a time when showing 'value for money' is a high political priority at a time when many European governments follow a policy of fiscal austerity.

12th EDF 2021-2027
The EDF has been incorporated as part of Global Europe into the 2021-2027 multi-annual financial framework of the EU. For the European Parliament, that makes a chance for a greater say in how these funds are distributed.

Stability component 
The Instrument for Stability (IfS, more commonly referred to as the Stability Instrument) was a financial and political instrument at the disposal of the European Union. It is prepared at strategic level by the EEAS and implemented by the European Commission. The objective is three-fold: 
 Respond to urgent needs due to political instability or a major disaster; 
 Build the conditions for long term stability in particular by addressing some major risks and threats that prevent political security and economic development, such as terrorism, organized crime, illicit trafficking, chemical-biological-nuclear risks but also new challenges such as pandemics, cybercrime, climate change or the protection of critical infrastructure; 
 Participate to the crisis management cycle by supporting CSDP operations and by contributing to restore stability after the crisis or the conflict.

The Instrument for Stability was proposed by the Commission in September 2004 and created by the Council and Parliament on 15 November 2006 through Regulation No 1717/2006. It replaces the Rapid Reaction Mechanism (RRM), which was considered unwieldy as it could only finance projects of up to six months.  In 2011 negotiations began for the next EU Multi-annual Financial Framework (MFF) 2014-2020 including the legal basis for the Instrument for Stability for the period.  The independent foundation the European Centre for Development Policy Management (ECDPM) suggested that while the IfS was a useful instrument for conflict prevention and peacebuilding that it was not appropriate for it to be the only EU financial instrument that should include them as a key consideration for the period 2014 - 2020.

Purpose
The purpose of the Instrument for Stability is to support measures aimed at safeguarding or re-establishing the conditions under which the partner countries of the European Union can pursue their long term development goals. The main added value of the IfS is its ability to provide support to the political strategy of the European Union in a third country.

The IfS may be deployed for crisis response and crisis preparedness (such a limited window of opportunity to prevent or resolve conflict, situations threatening to escalate into armed conflict or severe destabilisation, or the urgent need to secure the conditions for the delivery of aid by the European Union), including in the case of major natural disaster. Besides tackling immediate crises or catastrophes in third countries, the IfS also addresses trans-regional risks and threats that are either natural or criminal in nature and may jeopardize the health, environment, economic development and safety conditions of people in the region. This trans-regional approach provided by the Instrument for Stability complements national measures provided by EU geographical instruments and contributes to strengthen the rule of law, good governance, safety and security at regional level. Regional centers of excellence (so called CBRN Centers of Excellence) are being established in five key regions of the world (the Middle East, South East Asia, Caucasus, Central Asia and Africa) to operate this transregional approach. These regional centers (CoEs) will be a platform of coordination and cooperation between donors and recipients in the field of safety and security.

The IfS can only finance operations where other financial instruments cannot respond within the timeframe necessary. In specific, the IfS cannot finance humanitarian assistance (which is the responsibility of ECHO) or finance projects that are longer than 18 months (which the commission should be able to finance through the regular financial instruments). In addition, specialised short-term financing instruments already exist for specific crises. These include regulations on food aid, human rights and democratisation, mine action and rehabilitation.

Deployment
For the deployment of the IfS, a simplified decision-making process is used. The Commission may adopt measures which apply immediately. The commission is assisted by a committee (composed of the representatives of the Member States and chaired by the representative of the commission, who does not vote in the committee), which is kept informed of all IfS measures taken by the commission. If the commission's actions are not in accordance with the opinion of the committee, the Council will immediately be informed, which may then overrule the Commission within 30 days, voting by qualified majority. The European Parliament, meanwhile, is informed by the Commission of committee proceedings on a regular basis.

Budget
The total budget for the period 2007-2013 is €2 billion, of which a maximum of 27% (ca. €550 million) will be spent on longer-term EC responses to global and trans-regional threats. The remaining 73% are earmarked for rapid initial responses to situations of political crisis and natural disasters.

Critics
Independent research by the European Centre for Development Policy Management (ECDPM), a think tank based in Maastricht (The Netherlands), shows that the EU has ensured the effective translation into practice of two key policy commitments of the 'Agenda for Change' - namely a more focused strategy for less developed countries (LDCs) and low-income countries (LICs), and the concentration of EU aid on a limited number of sectors and policy priorities. Their research found that the high degree of compliance was achieved "through top-level support and tight control from headquarters".

While the principles of the 'Agenda for Change' appear to have been followed, ECDPM showed that in many countries initial programming proposals based on in-country consultations, managed by EU Delegations, were then superseded by the choices of EU headquarters in Brussels. Although the 11th EDF is closely aligned with national development plans, there is evidence that this top-down approach to programming has led to a significant erosion of key aid and development effectiveness principles, in particular country ownership.

See also
 ACP-EU Development Cooperation
 ACP-EU Joint Parliamentary Assembly
 The Courier – a former magazine of Africa-Caribbean-Pacific and European Union cooperation and relations
 Development Cooperation Instrument
 EuropeAid Co-Operation Office
 Technical Assistance to the Commonwealth of Independent States

References

External links
 EU Neighbourhood Info Centre
 EU Neighbourhood Library
European Commission: European Development Fund (EDF)
Europa: Summaries of EU legislation: European Development Fund
EC Aid to Africa African Voices in Europe

 
European Union foreign aid